Leptodeira maculata, the southwestern cat-eyed snake, is a species of snake in the family Colubridae.  The species is native to Mexico.

References

Leptodeira
Snakes of North America
Reptiles of Mexico
Endemic fauna of Mexico
Reptiles described in 1861
Taxa named by Edward Hallowell (herpetologist)